The 1953 Major League Baseball All-Star Game was the 20th playing of the mid-summer classic between the All-Stars teams of the American League (AL) and National League (NL), the two leagues comprising Major League Baseball. The game was held on July 14 at Crosley Field in Cincinnati, home of the Cincinnati Redlegs of the National League. The team changed its name from Reds to Redlegs this season, during the height of anti-communism in the United States; it returned to the Reds six years later.

This was the second All-Star Game at Crosley Field, which had previously hosted fifteen years earlier in 1938. This game was originally scheduled for Braves Field in Boston, which had hosted in 1936. When the Braves relocated to Milwaukee in mid-March, the game was awarded to Cincinnati.

Summary
From 1949 through 1952, manager Casey Stengel had taken the New York Yankees to four consecutive World Series titles, but this time turned on his fourth defeat in a row at the helm of the American League team.

Robin Roberts (NL) and Billy Pierce (AL) found themselves in a pitching duel during three innings of one-hit shutout ball, but they were not a factor in the decision. AL relievers Allie Reynolds (2), Mike Garcia (1) and Satchel Paige (2) combined to give up five runs to the NL hitters.

The NL attack was led by Enos Slaughter, who went 2-for-3 with two runs and an RBI, while Pee Wee Reese hit a single and a double and drove in two runs. Minnie Miñoso went 2-for-2 and drove in the only run for the AL team.

NL relievers Warren Spahn and Curt Simmons pitched two scoreless innings each and Murry Dickson allowed the only AL run in two innings of work. Spahn was the winning pitcher and Reynolds the loser, while Dickson earned the save.

The National League extended their winning-streak to four consecutive games, matching the previous record set by the American League from 1946 to 1949, After the game, the American League leads 12–8.

Notes
 The relief appearance by 46-year-old Satchel Paige in the eighth inning was an All-Star record for oldest pitcher in the contest.
  It was the first All-Star Game without a home run since 1944 at Forbes Field, and the third overall since 1938 at Crosley Field.
 Ted Williams threw out the ceremonial first pitch of the game just four days after being released from military service. Selected for the American League roster in the poll he did not play in the game. Williams signed a new contract with the Boston Red Sox and began working out with the club in late July.

Opening Lineups

Rosters
Players in italics have since been inducted into the National Baseball Hall of Fame.

Umpires

Line Score

Play-by-play at Retrosheet

References

External links
Baseball Almanac
Baseball Reference
IMDb.com

Major League Baseball All-Star Game
Major League Baseball All-Star Game
20th century in Cincinnati
Major League Baseball All Star Game
Baseball competitions in Cincinnati
July 1953 sports events in the United States